Kværner Station is a former railway station on the Gjøvik Line, located at Kværner in Oslo, Norway.

On Kvaerner station was a small station building, which was sold to the Urskog–Høland Line, and in 1973 relocated to Bingsfoss station.

References

Railway stations in Oslo
Disused railway stations in Norway
Railway stations on the Gjøvik Line
Railway stations opened in 1958
Railway stations closed in 1977
1958 establishments in Norway
1977 disestablishments in Norway